John Clifton may refer to:

John Clifton (MP for Stafford) (died 1400), MP for Stafford (UK Parliament constituency)
John Clifton (MP for Nottinghamshire) (died 1403), MP for Nottinghamshire (UK Parliament constituency)
John Clifton (master founder), master founder at the Whitechapel Bell Foundry, London, 1632–1640
John C. Clifton (1781–1841), English musical composer
John Clifton (medical physicist) (born 1930)
John Clifton (tennis)
John Talbot Clifton, English landowner and traveller
John Talbot Clifton (MP), English landowner and Member of Parliament